Michael Roy Weger (born October 2, 1945) is a former football player at Bowling Green University, and a defensive back for the Detroit Lions and the Houston Oilers.

College career
Weger and his family moved to Bowling Green, Ohio when he was in seventh grade.  He stayed in town to play collegiate football at Bowling Green State University. There, Weger played for coach Doyt Perry and was part of the 1965 Mid-American Conference championship team.  After his senior season, he participated in the Senior Bowl and the Blue–Gray Football Classic.

Professional career
Weger was drafted by the Detroit Lions in the 1967 NFL Draft in the 9th round, the 218th pick overall.

Weger played safety for the Lions from 1967 to 1975, and with the Houston Oilers from 1976 to 1977.  He was twice named honorable mention All-Pro by the Associated Press.  He finished his career with 17 interceptions, six fumble recoveries and scored two defensive touchdowns.

He also played a small part as himself in the 1968 film Paper Lion. He sang the unofficial BGSU Fight Song "Ay-Ziggy-Zoomba" in the film.

Weger is currently involved in real estate development.  For a time he operated a golf driving range and recreation center on M-24 in Lake Orion, Michigan, which also served as a location for Detroit Lions special events.. 

Mike Weger was involved in land swap at M-24 and Scripps Road to clear cut and develop previously state owned land. The land swap was deemed controversial and took several years of fighting with local city officials to go through.

References

1945 births
Living people
Players of American football from Dallas
American football safeties
Detroit Lions players
Houston Oilers players
Bowling Green Falcons football players
People from Bowling Green, Ohio
Sportspeople from Oakland County, Michigan
Players of American football from Ohio